Qiu Ersao (1822 – 1853), was a Chinese rebel and military commander during the Taiping Rebellion. Originally a religious leader within the Tiandihui, she later had 500 female soldiers under her command.

Biography 
Born in Qiaoxu, Guixian County, Guangxi Province, her husband was an opium addict, so she was in charge of supporting her family, preparing and selling sweets in the local market. Tired of corruption and abuse by the authorities, in the fall of 1849 she joined the Red Turban Rebellion (1854–1856) and learned martial arts. In 1850 she joined the Taiping Rebellion and, along with Su Sanniang, commanded the Rebellion's female troops. Qiu Ersao decorated her sword with red pompoms. As a combatant, she stood out as a speaker. She died in a confrontation with a local militia in the fall of 1853, when she fell from her horse after being struck by enemy fire.

References 
 Lily Xiao Hong Lee, Clara Lau, A.D. Stefanowska: Biographical Dictionary of Chinese Women: v. 1: The Qing Period, 1644–1911 

1822 births
1853 deaths
19th-century Chinese people
People of the Taiping Rebellion
Women in 19th-century warfare
Women in war in China
19th-century Chinese women
Tianduhui members 
Military leaders of the Taiping Rebellion